Geldenhuys is a surname. Notable people with the surname include:

Burger Geldenhuys (born 1956), South African rugby union player
Hendrik Geldenhuys (born 1983), Namibian cricketer
Johannes Geldenhuys (born 1935), South African military commander
Preller Geldenhuys (born 1943), Rhodesian-born South African pilot and author
Quintin Geldenhuys (born 1981), South Africa-born Italian rugby union player
Ross Geldenhuys (born 1983), South African rugby union footballer
Johannes Wessel Geldenhuys (born 7 March 1989), South Africa. - Production Manager/Farmer